Guangdong Intercity Railway Operation Co., Ltd., also known as Guangdong Intercity, is a wholly owned subsidiary of Guangzhou Metro Group and is mainly engaged in the operation of Pearl River Delta Metropolitan Region intercity railway. The company was registered in Guangzhou on June 11, 2019, at Nansha District, Guangzhou.

Guangdong Intercity is operating Guangzhou-Qingyuan intercity railway, Guangzhou East Ring intercity railway and Guangzhou Metro Line 18 and Line 22. It will operate Xinbaiguang intercity railway, Foshan–Dongguan intercity railway and Guangzhou–Foshan circular intercity railway in the future.

References

Railway companies of China
Railway companies established in 2019
Guangzhou Metro
2019 establishments in China